Saint Christopher School is an elementary school located in Metairie, Louisiana.  The school teaches children from kindergarten to seventh grade.  Saint Christopher is recognized by the United States Department of Education as a National School of Excellence and was named a Blue Ribbon School for the 1993–1994 school year.

References

External links
Official site

Private middle schools in Louisiana
Private elementary schools in Louisiana
Schools in Jefferson Parish, Louisiana